Kevin Stadler (born February 5, 1980) is an American professional golfer who plays on the PGA Tour and formerly on the European Tour.

Early life

Stadler, the son of former Masters champion and 13-time PGA Tour winner Craig Stadler (known affectionately by pros and fans as The Walrus)  and Susan Barrett, was born in Reno, Nevada. He moved with his family to Denver, Colorado, where he attended Kent Denver School, excelling on the school's golf team. He graduated from the University of Southern California and turned professional in 2002.

Professional career

In 2004 Stadler won twice on the second tier Nationwide Tour, and finished 13th on the money list to win a place on the 2005 PGA Tour. In his rookie season on the elite tour he came 168th on the money list, thus losing his playing status.

Early in 2006 Stadler won the Johnnie Walker Classic in Australia, gaining a two-year exemption on the European, Asian, and Australasian tours. Stadler commented, "I am honestly baffled by this win.... It was my intention this year just to play the Nationwide Tour and get my PGA Tour card back but now I have no idea what I will do". His dilemma was that the European Tour, on which he became eligible to play, is much more prestigious and lucrative than the Nationwide Tour, but unlike the Nationwide Tour it did not offer a direct route to his objective of regaining his playing privileges on the PGA Tour. For the remainder of 2006 he divided his time between the two tours, winning twice on the Nationwide Tour, and finishing twelfth on the money list to regain his PGA Tour card with effect from the start of the 2007 season.

During the 2009 season Stadler lost in a playoff at the Wyndham Championship to Ryan Moore. At the time Moore and Stadler were both trying to capture their first PGA Tour title.

On February 2, 2014, Stadler won the Waste Management Phoenix Open marking his first PGA Tour victory. Stadler won after Bubba Watson made bogey on the 18th hole. The event was Stadler's 239th PGA Tour start and would ensure him of his first Masters invitation. Craig and Kevin were the first father-son duo to play at Augusta in the same tournament. Kevin is also the first son of a Masters champion to play in that tournament. Kevin is nicknamed as "Smallrus," a play on his father's nickname of "Walrus." Kevin finished T8 in his Masters debut, ensuring him of making the 2015 field. He missed the cut in 2015. His career-best world ranking was 52nd in 2014.

Stadler was one of the few golfers to employ the use of an anchor putter, which the PGA Tour banned on January 1, 2016. In preparation for the ban, Stadler started putting left-handed.

A broken bone in his left hand limited Stadler to five events during the 2014−15 season. Stadler attempted a comeback on the Web.com Tour's Digital Ally Open in 2017, but he withdrew after the first round. He entered the 2017–18 season with a Major Medical Extension that required him to earn 454.420 FedEx Cup points or $717,890 in 26 starts in order to retain his PGA Tour privileges, but was unable to meet the terms.

Amateur wins (1)
1997 Doug Sanders Junior World Championship

Professional wins (9)

PGA Tour wins (1)

PGA Tour playoff record (0–1)

European Tour wins (1)

1Co-sanctioned with the Asian Tour and the PGA Tour of Australasia

Nationwide Tour wins (4)

Nationwide Tour playoff record (2–0)

Challenge Tour wins (1)

1Co-sanctioned by the Tour de las Américas

Other wins (2)

Other playoff record (2–0)

Results in major championships

CUT = missed the half-way cut
"T" = tied

Results in The Players Championship

CUT = missed the halfway cut
"T" indicates a tie for a place

Results in World Golf Championships

QF, R16, R32, R64 = Round in which player lost in match play
WD = withdrew
"T" = Tied
Note that the HSBC Champions did not become a WGC event until 2009.

See also
2004 Nationwide Tour graduates
2006 Nationwide Tour graduates
List of golfers with most Web.com Tour wins

References

External links

American male golfers
USC Trojans men's golfers
PGA Tour golfers
PGA Tour of Australasia golfers
Korn Ferry Tour graduates
Golfers from Nevada
Golfers from Denver
Golfers from Scottsdale, Arizona
Kent Denver School alumni
Sportspeople from Reno, Nevada
1980 births
Living people